Robinsonekspedisjonen: 1999, was the first season of the Norwegian version of the Swedish show Expedition Robinson and it premiered on 19 September 1999 and aired until 5 December 1999. The first season took place on the island of Cadlao outside of the Philippines. Nils Ole Oftebro was the host for the first season of Robinsonekspedisjonen. Keeping with the tradition of the Swedish version, the two tribes were simply named "Lag Nord" (North Team) and "Lag Sør" (South Team). Ultimately, Christer Falch won the season over Hanne Cecilie Akre by a unanimous jury vote of 8-0. As Christer was seen as the mastermind of the dominant alliance this season and was also seen as the best player, he would take over as host of the show from season 2 on. Unlike Expedition Robinson, the Norwegian version of the show did not meet the expectations of TV3; however, it was renewed for several more seasons.

Finishing order

Voting history

External links
http://www.dagbladet.no

 1999
1999 Norwegian television seasons